Epischnia muscidella is a species of snout moth in the genus Epischnia. It was described by Ragonot in 1887, and is known from Turkey.

References

Moths described in 1887
Phycitini
Endemic fauna of Turkey
Insects of Turkey